Action Man is a children's animated/live-action television series, created by DIC Productions, L.P. and Bohbot Entertainment, which originally aired on the latter's Amazin' Adventures syndicated block. The cartoon is based on the Hasbro toy line of the same name. The show also featured live action segments before and after the main show, which were filmed at Universal Studios Hollywood and Florida.

Plot
Action Man is a member of an elite multinational task force named Action Force who fight against the terrorist Dr. X and his "Council of Doom". Action Man is also portrayed as being an amnesiac who is trying to unlock the mystery of his past.

Cast
Mark Griffin as Action Man / Matthew Exler
Rolf Leenders as Doctor X / Dorian Exler
Joely Collins as Natalie Poole
Dale Wilson as Knuck Williams
Iris Quinn as Vira
Richard Cox as Jacques
David Hay as Professor Gangrene
Garry Chalk as Secretary Norris

Additional cast
Nigel Bennett
Lisa Bunting
Christopher Gaze
Chris Humphreys
David Morse
Colin Murdock
Rick Poltaruk
Simon Pidgeon
William Samples
Devon Sawa
Paulina Gillis
Tracey-Lee Smyth
Ingrid Tesch

Episodes

Toys
The show introduced several new teammates for Action Man which were then made into toys. The action figures of Natalie Poole and Knuck have become very rare collectors items. At Joecon 2010, a convention exclusive Q-Force action figure of Natalie Poole was released.

Media releases

United States
In November 2001, Lions Gate Home Entertainment and Trimark Home Video released two VHS tapes titled "Secret of Action Man" and "Action Man in Space", containing two episodes each. A DVD also titled Action Man in Space was also released, containing the same four episodes as the VHS's. None of these DVDs contain the live-action segments.

In 2003, Sterling Entertainment released a DVD called "Space Wars". It was re-released by NCircle Entertainment in 2007. As with the Lions Gate releases, this DVD doesn't feature the live-action segments either.

In February 2015, Mill Creek Entertainment released Action Man- The Complete Series on DVD in Region 1 as part of their "Retro TV Toons" series. This marked the first time all episodes of the show had received a DVD release.

United Kingdom
In the United Kingdom, the series was released on VHS by Abbey Home Entertainment/]PolyGram and later Just Entertainment and Abbey Home Media.

The episodes were also released on DVD by Abbey Home Media, with two releases from Prism Leisure, but the episodes on the DVDs are in a random order, and many episodes have been released numerous times while several have not been released at all. This has caused confusion amongst many fans.

VHS

DVD

Other Countries
In Latin America and France, VHS tapes of the series were released by Buena Vista Home Entertainment, once again usually containing two episodes.

References

External links
 
IMDB: Episode list for "Action Man" (1995)
TV.com: Action Man (1995) Episode Guide

1995 American television series debuts
1996 American television series endings
1990s American animated television series
1995 British television series debuts
1996 British television series endings
1990s British animated television series
American children's animated action television series
American children's animated space adventure television series
American television series with live action and animation
British children's animated action television series
British children's animated space adventure television series
British television series with live action and animation
English-language television shows
Television shows based on Hasbro toys
Espionage television series
Television series by DIC Entertainment
Television series by Claster Television